Wuhan Metro is a rapid transit system serving the city of Wuhan, China.

The following is the lists of Wuhan Metro stations in operation sorted by lines.

System map

Line 1

Line 2

Line 3

Line 4

Line 5

Line 6

Line 7

Line 8

Line 11

Line 16

Yangluo Line

Notes

References

Wuhan Metro
Wuhan Metro stations
Wuhan